S. lepidus may refer to:
 Scopelosaurus lepidus, a species in the genus Scopelosaurus
 Sitona lepidus, a weevil species in the genus Sitona
 Stictonectes lepidus, a beetle species in the genus Stictonectes

See also
 Lepidus (disambiguation)